Joseph Smyth may refer to:

 Joseph Capel Smyth (1830–1914), member of the Queensland Legislative Council
 Joseph Grigsby Smyth (1847–1915), Texan politician
 Joseph Hilton Smyth (1901–1972), American publisher and pulp author
 Joe Smyth (basketball) (1929–1999), American basketball player

See also
 Joe Smyth (born 1985), British boxer